Palmas is a barrio in the municipality of Cataño, Puerto Rico. Its population in 2010 was 23,857.

Features and demographics

Sectors
Barrios (which are like minor civil divisions) in turn are further subdivided into smaller local populated place areas/units called sectores (sectors in English). The types of sectores may vary, from normally sector to urbanización to reparto to barriada to residencial, among others.

The following sectors are in Palmas barrio:

Notable landmarks
Palmas is home to the Bacardi distillery complex.

Gallery

See also

 List of communities in Puerto Rico
 List of barrios and sectors of Cataño, Puerto Rico

References

Barrios of Cataño, Puerto Rico